The Arts and How They Was Done was a comedy radio programme that aired from April 2007-May 2007, featuring Desmond Olivier Dingle and the entire National Theatre of Brent, Raymond Box.  There were six half-hour episodes and it was broadcast on BBC Radio 4. It starred Patrick Barlow and John Ramm, and was directed by Martin Duncan.

Episode list

Notes and references

External links
 

BBC Radio 4 programmes